The Kingdom of Luang Phrabang, also called Kingdom of Luang Prabang was formed in 1707 as a result of the split of the Kingdom of Lan Xang. When the kingdom split, Muang Phuan became a tributary state of Luang Prabang. Over the years the monarchy weakened even more, and was forced to become a vassal various times to the Burmese and the Siamese monarchies.

A French consulate was established in the capital of Luang Prabang in 1885. The kingdom was at this time a Siamese vassal, who feared French plans of annexing of Luang Prabang. A treaty was signed on 7 May 1886 between Siam and France recognizing Siamese suzerainty over Luang Prabang and neighboring Lao kingdoms. France conducted expeditions in the region, searching for the possibility of establishing French territory there. A particularly destructive attack during the Haw wars by the Chinese Black Flag Army in 1887 saw King Oun Kham request French protection. This was accepted and signed on 27 March 1889, against Siamese protest.

France and Siam went to war in 1893, culminating in the Paknam incident when France, contrary to promises it had made to Great Britain, entered Bangkok with warships. Siam was forced to accept the French ultimatum, to cede the lands east of the Mekong including its islands. The French Protectorate of Laos was officially established, with the administrative capital moved from Luang Prabang to Vientiane. However, Luang Prabang remained the seat of the royal family, whose power was reduced to figureheads while the actual power was transferred over to French officials including the vice consulate and Resident-General. In January 1896, France and the United Kingdom signed an accord recognizing the border between French Laos and British Burma. Under French protection, the Kingdom of Luang Prabang became the principal kingdom of French Laos. On 11 May 1947, the Kingdoms of Luang Prabang, Vientiane, and Champassak were reorganized into the Kingdom of Laos, with the King of Luang Prabang, Sisavang Vong, becoming King of Laos. In 1954, the Kingdom of Laos gained full independence from France.

Kings of Luang Phrabang
Kitsarat (1707–1713)
Ong Kham (1713–1723)
Thao Ang (Inthason) (1723–1749)
Intharavongsa (1749)
Inthaphom (1749)
Sotika-Kuomane (1749–1768) (Burmese vassal, 1765–1768)
Surinyavong II (1768–1788) (Burmese vassal, 1768–1788)
Siamese occupation (1791–1792)
Anurutha (3 February 1792 – 179..) (1st reign)
Siamese occupation (179.. – 2 June 1794)
Anurutha (2 June 1794 – 31 December 1819) (2nd reign)
Manthaturath (31 December 1819 – 7 March 1837) (Regent for Anurutha from 1817 until 31 December 1819; lives as a monk in Bangkok from 1825 until 1826, leaving Luang Phra Bang to be administered by Thai officials)
Unkeo (1837–1838) (Regent)
Sukha-Söm (1838 – 23 September 1850)
Chantharath (23 September 1850 – 1 October 1868)
Oun Kham (1 October 1868 – 15 December 1895) (Zakarine was regent for Oun Kham from April 1888 until 15 December 1895)
Zakarine (15 December 1895 – 25 March 1904) (in the French protectorate)
Sisavang Vong (26 March 1904 – 20 October 1945/27 August 1946) (in the French protectorate)

References

History of Laos
Early Modern Thailand
Former countries in Southeast Asia
Luang Prabang
Former monarchies of Asia
18th century in Laos
19th century in Laos
20th century in Laos
18th century in Siam
19th century in Siam
20th century in Thailand
States and territories established in 1707
States and territories disestablished in 1947
1707 establishments in Asia
1947 disestablishments in Asia
Former protectorates
Former monarchies of Southeast Asia
States and territories established in 1945
States and territories disestablished in 1945
1945 establishments in Asia
1945 disestablishments in Asia